Jackson Symphony Orchestra may refer to:
 Jackson Symphony Orchestra (Michigan) in Jackson, Michigan
 Jackson Symphony Orchestra (Tennessee) in Jackson, Tennessee
 Mississippi Symphony Orchestra in Jackson, Mississippi (formerly named Jackson Symphony Orchestra)